Camrose is a village, parish and community in the historic cantref of Roose in Pembrokeshire,  Wales. The community includes the villages of Keeston and Wolfsdale. Since 1987 the parish has been expanded to include the whole historic parish of Lambston (including Lambston, Sutton and Portfield Gate) and parts of Haverfordwest St Martins.

Camrose is an anglicization of the Welsh Camros, meaning "crooked" or "broken moor". The village contains a substantial Norman motte, which is often referred to as a "Landsker castle" although it lies far to the south (English) side of that linguistic boundary.  A small area, north of Dudwell Mountain, has been Welsh-speaking in modern times but was probably English-speaking before the Enclosures at the end of the 18th century.

The parish church is dedicated to the 6th-century Breton prince and Welsh saint Isfael and is a grade II* listed building. The extent of the civil parish of Camrose is 3,386 hectares.

Population
Camrose is an electoral ward with a population at the 2011 Census of 2,565.

The village has its own elected community council and gives its name to an electoral ward of Pembrokeshire County Council.  The electoral ward of Camrose covers the communities of Camrose and Nolton and Roch. The seat has been held by an independent member since the reorganisation of 1995. Following the most recent election, it is currently represented by the former leader of Pembrokeshire County Council, Jamie Adams.

Football Club
The village football team, currently in Division 2 of the Pembrokeshire league plays its home matches at Folly Fields at the northern edge of the village, and is managed by Jamie Gilderdale.  The second team languish in Division 4 but finished 3rd in division 4 in the 09–10 season and narrowly missed out on promotion. The football team have an official website.

Notes

External links 
Photos of Camrose and surrounding area on geograph.org.uk
The Camrose War Memorial

Villages in Pembrokeshire
Communities in Pembrokeshire